Charles Brockman may refer to:

 Charles Samuel Brockman (1845–1923), explorer and pastoralist in Western Australia
 Charlie Brockman (1928–2005), American broadcaster